The Left Party (V) is a socialist political party in Sweden. On economic issues, the party opposes privatizations and advocates increased public expenditure. In foreign policy, the party is Eurosceptic, being critical of the European Union, and opposing NATO and Swedish entry into the eurozone. It attempted to get Sweden to join the Non-Aligned Movement in 1980, but did not succeed. The party is eco-socialist, and also supports anti-racism, feminism, and republicanism. It is placed on the left-wing of the political spectrum.

The party has never been part of a government at the national level, though it has lent parliamentary support to the Swedish Social Democratic Party-led government in the Riksdag. From 1998 to 2006, the Left Party was in a confidence-and-supply arrangement with the ruling Social Democrats and the Green Party. Since 2014, it has supported the minority government of Social Democrats and Greens in the Riksdag, as well as in many of Sweden's counties and municipalities.

The party originated as a split from the Social Democrats in 1917, as the Swedish Social Democratic Left Party (SSV), and became the Communist Party of Sweden in 1921. In 1967, the party was renamed Left Party – the Communists (VPK); it adopted its current name in 1990. The Left Party is a member of the Nordic Green Left Alliance, and its sole MEP sits in the European United Left–Nordic Green Left (GUE/NGL) group. In 2018, the party joined Maintenant le Peuple.

History

1910s 
Revolutionary fervour engulfed Sweden in 1917. Riots took place in many cities. In Västervik, a workers council took control of day-to-day affairs. In Stockholm, soldiers marched together with workers on May Day. In the upper-class neighbourhood of Stockholm, Östermalm, residents formed paramilitary structures to defend themselves from a possible armed revolution.

The party originated as a split from the Swedish Social Democratic Party in 1917, as the Swedish Social Democratic Left Party (Sveriges socialdemokratiska vänsterparti, SSV). The split occurred as the Social Democratic Party did not support the 1917 Bolshevik revolution in Russia, whereas SSV did support the Bolsheviks. Another reason for the split was also the opposition against the social democratic cooperation with the Liberals and the increasing militarism. The SSV brought with them 15 of the 87 Social Democratic members of parliament and the youth wing. Many of the breakaways were inspired by Lenin's revolutionary Bolsheviks, others by libertarian socialism. Almost all SSV leaders eventually returned to the Social Democrats (SAP), but the foundation was laid for a party on the left wing of the labor movement.

1920s 
In 1921, in accordance with the 21 theses of the Comintern, the party name was changed to Communist Party of Sweden (SKP ). Liberal and non-revolutionary elements were purged. They regrouped under the name SSV. In total, 6,000 out of 17,000 party members were expelled.

Zeth Höglund, the main leader of the party during the split from the Social Democrats, left the party in 1924. Höglund was displeased with the developments in Moscow after the death of Vladimir Lenin, and he founded his own Communist Party, independent from the Comintern. Around 5,000 party members followed Höglund.

On 23 and 24 January 1926, SKP organized a trade union conference with delegates representing 80,000 organized workers.

In 1927, SKP organized a conference of National Association of the Unemployed, and called for the abolition of the Unemployment Commission (AK).

In 1929, a major split, the largest in the history of the party, took place. Nils Flyg, Karl Kilbom, Ture Nerman, all MPs, and the majority of the party membership were expelled by the Comintern. The expelled were called Kilbommare, and those loyal to the Comintern were called Sillenare (after their leader Hugo Sillén). Out of 17,300 party members, 4,000 sided with Sillén and the Comintern. Conflicts erupted locally over control of party offices and property. In Stockholm, the office of the central organ, held by the Kilbommare, was besieged by Comintern loyalists. Fist-fights erupted in Gothenburg, in a clash over control of the party office. Effectively, the Kilbom-Flyg factions continued to operate their party under the name of Socialist Party, soon renamed Socialistiska partiet. Notably, they took with them the central organ of the party, Folkets Dagblad Politiken. SKP started new publications, including Ny Dag and Arbetar-Tidningen.

Under Sillén's leadership, the party adhered to the "Class against Class"-line, denouncing any co-operation with the Social Democrats. Sven Linderot, a dynamic young leader, become the party chairman.

1930s 
The infamous Ådalen shootings of unarmed demonstrating workers took place in 1931. This development led to increased labour militancy and gave new life to the crisis-ridden SKP.

The Spanish Civil War began in 1936. SKP and its youth wing sent a sizeable contingent to fight in the International Brigades. 520 Swedes took part in the brigades and 164 of them died there. Simultaneously, an extensive solidarity work for the Second Spanish Republic and the people of Spain was organized in Sweden.

During the 1930s, the party was rebuilt; as the Kilbom-Flyg party crumbled, the party base was enhanced. By 1939, SKP had 19,116 members.

1940s 
The Second World War (1939–1945) was a difficult time for the party. The party was the sole political force in Sweden supporting the Soviet side in the Winter War, which was frequently used as a pretext for the repression against the party. The party supported Soviet military expansion along its Western border. Ny Dag, the main party organ, wrote on 26 July: "The border states have been liberated from their dependence of imperialist superpowers through the help from the great socialist worker's state."

Moreover, the party supported the Molotov–Ribbentrop Pact. The Central Committee adopted a declaration in September 1939, which read: "The ruling cliques in England and France have in fear of Bolshevism, in their badly hidden sympathy for Fascism, in fear of workers power in Europe, refused to enter into an agreement with adoptable conditions for the Soviet Union to effectively crush the plans of the warmongers. They have supported the refusal of Poland to accept the Soviet help. The Soviet Union has thus, in clear accordance with its consequent politics of peace, through a non-aggression pact with Germany sought to defend the 170-million people of the first socialist state against Fascist attacks and the bottomless misery of a world war."

When Nazi Germany invaded Norway in April 1940, SKP took a neutralist stand. In an article in Ny Dag, the German take-over in Norway was described as a "set-back for British imperialism".

Following orders by the German legation in Stockholm, several repressive measures were taken by the Swedish government against the party. The main publications were effectively banned (they were banned from transportation, meaning it was illegal to carry the SKP newspapers by any form of vehicle). Key cadres of the party and youth league were detained in camps, officially as a part of their military service. In total, 3500 persons were interned at ten different camps, the great majority of them were communists. Many party activists went underground, including the party chairman. A complete ban on the party was discussed in government circles, but never became effective.

In 1940, the office of the regional party organ in Norrbotten, Norrskensflamman, was bombed. Five people, including two children, were killed. This constitutes the deadliest terrorist act committed in Sweden in the 1900s. One of the financial supporters of the group behind the attack, Paul Wretlind, was a regional leader of the Liberal Party in Stockholm.

During the war, the largest co-ordinated police action in Swedish history took place against the party. 3,000 policemen took part in raids on party offices and homes of party members all over the country. However, the raids failed to produce any evidence of any criminal activity of the party.

The party actively supported resistance struggles in Norway and Denmark. In northern Sweden, party-affiliated workers stole dynamite from mines, and smuggled them to the Norwegian resistance. In other parts, the party gave shelter to anti-fascist refugees.

As the military fortunes of the Third Reich turned sour, the party regained a strong position in Swedish politics. In the parliamentary elections of 1944, SKP got 10.3% of the votes.

In 1945, there was a nationwide metal workers' strike, led by SKP.

In the 1946 municipal elections, SKP got 11.2% of the votes. Party membership reached its historical peak, 51,000. These developments, along with developments in the international arena and new Soviet policies of peaceful co-existence, led the party to initiate a re-adjustment of its role in Swedish politics. The electoral gains strengthened the perception that the party would be able to come to power within the parliamentary framework. Likewise, the idea of a "united front" with the Social Democrats gained ground in the inner-party debate. The trade union policy of the party was changed towards a less conflictive position towards the Social Democracy within the trade union movement. These changes met with some resistance in the party ranks.

However, the onset of the Cold War became a difficult challenge to the party. The electoral gains of the post-war years would not last long. The prime minister Tage Erlander declared the intention to turn "every trade union into a battlefield against the communists". Communists were purged from the trade union movement. However, the party continued its development of the united front strategy.

1950s 
In the 1952 parliamentary by-elections in Jämtland and Kristianstad, the party decided to withdraw its lists, in order to ensure that the Social Democrats would not lose the elections. The party leadership argued that communists had to make an effort to "ensure a labour majority in the Riksdag". Moreover, the two concerned counties were electoral districts where it was highly unlikely that any communist MP would be elected. However, the leftist minority within the party (led by Set Persson) saw the new line as a capitulation to the Social Democrats.

Another issue concerned the youth league. The party took an initiative to create a broad-based youth movement, looking at similar developments in countries like Finland. In 1952, Democratic Youth (Demokratisk Ungdom ) was founded as a broad youth movement, parallel to the existing Young Communist League of Sweden. The hard-liners saw this as diluting the political character of the youth movement.

An issue of high symbolic importance was the decision of the party to promote joint May Day rallies with the Social Democrats. Yet another issue was the decision of the party to give financial support to the "labour press", which was essentially in the hands of the Social Democrats.

In March 1951, Hilding Hagberg became party chairman.

The intra-party polemic reached its peak at the 1953 party congress. Persson fiercely exposed his criticism, particularly towards the new party chairman Hagberg, whom he branded as an opportunist. Persson was in turn accused of being an egoist, and of wanting to divide and damage the party. Criticism was delivered towards Persson by Knut Senander and Nils Holmberg, who said that Persson had to be held accountable for lack of political orientation and anti-party actions. Both Senander and Holmberg were considered as being part of the leftist section of the party, but on this occasion they appeared as the most firebrand defenders of the party line. Only a handful of delegates defended Persson, and those who did clearly highlighted that they did not fully share Persson's critique of the line of the party leadership. In a highly emotional conclusion of the debate, Persson declared his resignation from the party in a speech to the congress. After his departure a purge was carried out against Persson's followers within the party, out of whom several were expelled.

When Joseph Stalin died the same year, the party organized a memorial function, which was addressed by C.-H. Hermansson.

When the Hungarian revolt broke out in 1956, internal party debate surged on what stand the party should take. In the end, the party leadership chose to support the official Soviet line.

1960s 
In 1961, leading party members founded the travel agency Folkturist, which specialized in tours to Eastern Europe.

In 1964, C.-H. Hermansson was elected party chairman. Hermansson came from an academic background, unlike previous party leaders. Hermansson initiated a change in the political direction of the party towards Eurocommunism and Nordic Popular socialism.

Ahead of the 1967 party congress, a heated debate took place. Several distinct tendencies were present. One section wanted to transform the party into a non-communist party, on the lines of the Danish Socialist People's Party (SF), and thus proposed that the party should change its name to Vänsterpartiet ("Left Party"). Another section, largely based amongst the trade union cadre of the party, wanted to maintain the communist character of the party and the fraternal bond to the CPSU. The former party leader Hagberg, who was associated with the pro-Soviet grouping, tried to launch the name Arbetets Parti ("Party of Labour"), as a compromise. The party leadership came up with another compromise, and the party name was changed to Left Party – the Communists (VPK). VPK continued on the Eurocommunist course, but with a loud pro-Soviet minority grouped around Norrskensflamman. In addition, there was a small pro-Chinese group led by Bo Gustafsson and Nils Holmberg, that left the party to form Communist Party of Sweden (KFML) at the time of the congress. The youth wing broke away, eventually forming Marxist-Leninistiska Kampförbundet (MLK).

In 1968, VPK was the first Swedish party to publicly condemn the Soviet intervention in Czechoslovakia. The party organized a demonstration outside the Soviet embassy in Stockholm, which was addressed by Hermansson. This disapproval of Soviet aggression was an exception among the Western communist parties. The party line on Czechoslovakia irritated the pro-Soviet minority.

In the municipal elections of 1968, VPK received 3,8% of the votes, the lowest electoral result of the party in the post-war era. Lacking a functioning youth and students wing, the party was unable to capitalize on the international surge of youth radicalism.

At the onset of protests against the U.S. war in Vietnam, VPK launched the Swedish Vietnam Committee. The Committee raised the demand 'Peace in Vietnam' and appealed for all-party unity on the issue. The committee was rapidly out-manoeuvered by the United FNL Groups (DFFG), an organization led by KFML that was actively supporting the armed struggle of the National Front for the Liberation of South Vietnam. Soon, VPK left the Swedish Vietnam Committee and many members became active in DFFG.

1970s 
In 1970, the youth wing was refounded as Kommunistisk Ungdom (KU).

In 1972, the party shifted towards a more leftist position with the adaptation of a new party programme. The neo-Leninist tendency emerged as an important section of the party.

In 1975, Lars Werner was elected party chairman. The runner-up candidate was Rolf Hagel of the pro-Soviet group. Werner was elected with 162 votes at the party congress. Hagel got 74 votes.

In February 1977, the pro-Soviet minority left the party, and founded the Workers' Party – Communists (APK). The founder of APK took with them the newspaper Norrskensflamman and two MPs (Hagel and Alf Löwenborg). Between 1,500 and 2,000 VPK members joined APK.

1980s 
In 1980, VPK was active in the "No"-campaign in the plebiscite on nuclear power.

1990s 
In 1990, VPK changed its name to Vänsterpartiet ((v), Left Party) and ceased to be a communist party.

In 1993, Werner resigned. Gudrun Schyman was elected party chairman.

In the 1994 parliamentary elections, the party received 6.2% of the votes. The prolonged electoral crisis of the party was thus ended. The influence of the party started to grow, especially amongst the youth. In the same year, the party was active in the "No"-campaign in the plebiscite on joining the European Union.

Having passed through a period of severe crisis, the party began to regain public support during the mid-1990s. In retrospect, the main factor behind this shift was not caused by the party itself, but by the fact that the Social Democrats had moved considerably towards the right during the preceding years, which had alienated much of its traditional votebank.

At the 1996 party congress, the Left Party declared itself to be feminist.

In 1998, the party obtained its best-ever result in a parliamentary election, getting 12% of the votes nationwide. Following the elections, the party entered into an arrangement with the Social Democrats, and started to support the government from outside.

2000s 
In the 2002 parliamentary elections, the voteshare of the party dropped by 3% to a total of 8.3%. Simultaneously, the Social Democrats regained 3%.

In 2003, Schyman resigned following tax irregularities. Ulla Hoffmann took over as interim leader.

The 2004 party congress elected Lars Ohly as the new party chairman. In the end of the year, Schyman left the party, becoming a parliamentary independent. Lars Ohly originally called himself a communist, but retracted that statement later.

In the same year, a two-part documentary on the party was broadcast on the SVT show Uppdrag Granskning. The documentary focused mainly on the international relations of the party during the post-war era. Following the broadcast, debate surged once again concerning the relations of the party with the ruling parties in the former Socialist Bloc.

In the September 2006 election, the Left Party got 317,228 votes (5.8%; in 2002: 8.4%), and therefore 22 Riksdag seats (previously 30). In the 2010 election, the party got 5.6% of the votes (334,053 votes) and 19 seats.

On 7 December 2008, the Social Democrats launched a political and electoral alliance known as the Red-Greens, together with the Left Party and the Green Party.

2010s 
The parties contested the 2010 general election on a joint manifesto, but lost the election to the incumbent centre-right coalition The Alliance. On 26 November 2010, the Red-Green alliance was dissolved.

On 6 January 2012, the Left Party congress elected Jonas Sjöstedt as the new party chairman, since Ohly had announced his resignation.

2020s 
On 31 October 2020, the party elected Nooshi Dadgostar as party leader, following the retirement of Sjöstedt.

On 15 June 2021, the party withdrew its support for the coalition government, after a disagreement on rent controls.

Ideology and policies

Labor policy 

The party opposes further liberalization of the Employment Protection Act, and vowed to initiate a vote of no confidence against the Löfven II Cabinet if they were to attempt such a liberalization.

Feminism
The Left Party claims that Sweden does not have social equality in regard to gender. The party thus advocates the creation of a specific Minister of Social Equality, as well as to introduce the teaching of "feminist self-defence" in high schools. Feminism as a concept was introduced in the party program in 1997, but it believes that it has always worked to strengthen women's rights. Feminist theory has grown into the party since the 1960s, when the women's movement gained a theoretical basis beyond Marxism.

During the 2020 - 2022 mandate period, five of the seven members (71%) of the Left Party's executive committee, and ten of the 16 other board members (63%), are female.

LGBT policy 
The party supports equality for the LGBT community in ''matrimonial law, inheritance law, and family law''. The party also sees its feminism as linked to its pro-LGBT stance.

Immigration and integration
The party supports a generous immigration policy, granting refugees permanent residency, and prioritizing family re-unification. A strong welfare system and the uniting of families is necessary for refugees to be able to integrate in society, according to the Left Party.

Foreign policy
In regards to the Israeli–Palestinian conflict, the party supports a two-state solution based on the 1967 border. The party calls for the freezing of EU trade agreements with Israel, ending Swedish military co-operation and arms trade with Israel, and a general consumer boycott of Israeli goods to put pressure on Israel.

In February 2019, the party dropped a long-held policy that Sweden should leave the European Union. However, by 2022 the party's platform was amended to support leaving the EU once again and called for the European Parliament to be either abolished or fundamentally changed.

The Left Party opposes joining NATO, stating that they support neutrality and freedom of alliance, and calls for a left-wing alliance in Europe to ensure the dissolution of NATO.

Republicanism 
The Left Party advocates for the abolition of the Swedish monarchy, instead favoring republicanism.

Splits
During its history, there have been several splits of various significance:
1919: A group opposed to joining the Comintern left the party.
1921: A group refusing to go along with the name-change to SKP was expelled. They formed their own party, called SSV.
1924: Zeth Höglund split, and formed his own SKP.
1929: Leader Karl Kilbom and the majority of the party were expelled by the Comintern. Kilbom formed a parallel SKP.
1956: Set Persson formed the Communist Labour League of Sweden.
1967: Pro-China elements formed the KFML.
1977: Pro-Moscow wing broke away, formed Workers Party - Communists
2004: Party chair Gudrun Schyman split from the party, and formed the Feminist Initiative.

Electoral results

Parliament (Riksdag)
Percentage of votes by year:

European Parliament

Party leaders
Carl Winberg, 1917
Zeth Höglund, 1917
Ernst Åström, 1918
Karl Kilbom, 1918
Zeth Höglund, 1919–1924
Karl Kilbom,  1921–1923
Nils Flyg, 1924–1929
Sven Linderot, 1929–1951
Hilding Hagberg, 1951–1964
C.-H. Hermansson, 1964–1975
Lars Werner, 1975–1993
Gudrun Schyman, 1993–2003
Ulla Hoffmann (acting), 2003–2004
Lars Ohly, 2004–2012
Jonas Sjöstedt, 2012–2020
Nooshi Dadgostar, 2020–

Publications
 Blekinge Folkblad (1943–1957)
 Bohustidningen (1946–1948)
 Borås Folkblad (1943–1957)
 Dalarnes Folkblad (1917–1925)
 Dalarnes Folkblad (1940–1956)
 Folkviljan (1942–1957)
 Folkviljan (1980–1989)
 Gästriklands Folkblad (1921–1922)
 Hälsingekuriren (1919–1923)
 Kalmar Läns–Kuriren (1923–1942)
 Norra Småland (1918–1923)
 Norrlandskuriren (1922)
 Norrskensflamman (1906–1977)
 Piteåbygden (1920)
 Röda Röster (1919–1930)
 Skånes Folkblad (1918–1922)
 Smålandsfolket (1940)
 Örebro Läns Arbetartidning (1940–1956)
 Örebro Läns Folkblad (1919–1920)
 Övre Dalarnes Tidning (1917–1920)

See also
Arbetarnas Bildningsförbund
C. N. Carleson
Democratic Farmers League of Sweden
Farm Workers Union of Småland
List of political parties in Sweden
Marxist Working Group
Östergötlands Arbetartidning
Referendums in Sweden
Ung Vänster
Vänstern i Svenska kyrkan

Notes

References

External links
Vänsterpartiet 
Vårt partiprogram 

 
1917 establishments in Sweden
Sweden
Feminism in Sweden
Left-wing parties in Europe
Political parties established in 1917
Socialism in Sweden